Wolfgang Ehrl (4 March 1912, in Munich – 11 June 1980, in Munich) was a German wrestler who competed at the 1932 Summer Olympics and the 1936 Summer Olympics.

References

External links
 

1912 births
1980 deaths
Olympic wrestlers of Germany
Wrestlers at the 1932 Summer Olympics
Wrestlers at the 1936 Summer Olympics
German male sport wrestlers
Olympic silver medalists for Germany
Olympic medalists in wrestling
Sportspeople from Munich
Medalists at the 1932 Summer Olympics
Medalists at the 1936 Summer Olympics
20th-century German people